Ricinine is a toxic alkaloid found in the castor plant. It can serve as a biomarker of ricin poisoning. It was first isolated from the castor seeds by Tuson in 1864.

Ricinine has insecticidal effects.

It sublimes between 170 and 180 °C at 20 mmHg. It does not form salts, and is precipitated in iodine or mercuric chloride solutions, but not in Mayer's reagent.

It can be hydrolyzed to methanol and ricininic acid by alkali.

See also
Ricin

References

Alkaloids
2-Pyridones
Nitriles
Ethers
Ricin
Plant toxins
Castor oil plant